The Queens Head is a public house, dating back to the 16th century, at 31 High Street, Pinner, in the London Borough of Harrow, England.

The timber-framed building was Grade II listed in 1968 by Historic England.

References

Pubs in the London Borough of Harrow
Grade II listed pubs in London
Timber framed buildings in London